Ken Chertow is an American Olympic freestyle wrestler, who competed at the 1988 Summer Olympics in Seoul, South Korea. Chertow currently conducts wrestling camps across the United States. He serves as a mentor for thousands of young wrestlers whom he coaches in his clinics, camps and Home Training Center in Boalsburg, Pennsylvania. In March 2017, he was named the first head coach of the just-established wrestling program at Queen's University of Charlotte.

Prep
Chertow won two West Virginia High School State Championships at Huntington High School in Huntington, West Virginia along with Outstanding Wrestler Awards. He culminated his prep career by winning Junior Nationals in both freestyle and Greco and the Junior World Championship.

College
While studying and training at Penn State, Chertow was a 3x NCAA All-American, World Espoir Champion, Pan American Champion and 1988 U.S. Olympian. Chertow also excelled in the classroom, where he was a 3X Academic All-American, graduating with a 3.6 GPA.
Chertow is also a member of Alpha Epsilon Pi.

Camps
Chertow  conducted summer day camps throughout college and started the Gold Medal Training System upon graduation from Penn State in 1989. During Chertow's first five years conducting camps, he also coached at Ohio State and Penn State. During his three years at Ohio State, he helped build the Buckeyes into a national powerhouse. Ohio State finished 4th and 5th in the 1991 and 1992 NCAA Championships.

Coaching
He returned to Penn State in 1992 and joined the Nittany Lion Coaching Staff. Chertow's team won the National Dual Meet Championship and was 2nd in the NCAA Championships, PSU's best finish since 1953.

In 1994, Chertow left college coaching to focus his time and energy on helping young people through his local wrestling school and to devote more time to developing his camp system. Many of Chertow's wrestlers have excelled, winning State & National Championships.

His dedication and skills, coupled with his commitment to surrounding his campers with the best possible staff in the nation, has made the Gold Medal Training Camp the most highly organized and successful camp system in the nation. Chertow's summer camp draws and develops many champions. From 1998-2010, high school campers won 500+ State Championships, while younger campers won well over 250 AAU, NHSCA, & USA National Championships.

Chertow conducts clinics throughout the country, has produced a series of instructional videos, and is the broadcast analyst for College Sports Television (CSTV) and the Big Ten Network (BTN).

Works
Chertow has also written a motivational book titled, Wrestling: A Commitment to Excellence.

Accomplishments

- 3X Academic All American
- 3X NCAA All American
- 2X Junior National Champion
- 2X Junior World Champion
- Midlands Champion & OW
- Elected to Midlands Hall of Fame
- Olympic Festival Champion
- U.S. National Team Competitor for 7 Consecutive Seasons
- 200+ USAW, NHSCA & AAU National Champions
- Tulsa National Team Championship
- Wrestling USA National Champions
- Gold Medal Training Camp 1989-2008
- 50+ H.S. State Champs 1998-2008
- Featured Clinician at: NCAA Coaches Clinic, NWCA National Convention
- Penn State Coach
- Ohio State Coach
- National Dual
- Big Ten & CBS Expert Analyst
- Broadcaster of the Year

See also
List of Pennsylvania State University Olympians

References

External links
 Official Site

Olympic wrestlers of the United States
Wrestlers at the 1988 Summer Olympics
American male sport wrestlers
Living people
Year of birth missing (living people)
Sportspeople from Huntington, West Virginia